Bianco Spartaco Gambini (18 July 1893 – 18 August 1966), known as just Bianco, was a Brazilian footballer. He played in five matches for the Brazil national football team in 1919. He was also part of Brazil's squad for the 1919 South American Championship.

References

External links
 

1893 births
1966 deaths
Brazilian footballers
Brazil international footballers
Footballers from São Paulo
Association football defenders
Sport Club Corinthians Paulista players
Sociedade Esportiva Palmeiras players
Brazilian expatriate footballers
Expatriate footballers in Argentina